= Soundslides =

Editors love

- Screenshot of Soundslides editor
- Developer(s): Soundslides
- Stable release: Soundslides - 3.0 / August 22, 2019; 5 years ago
- Operating system: OS X Windows
- Type: Audio slideshow editing software
- License: Proprietary
- Website: Soundslides

Soundslides is software for creating audio slideshows, a combination of still photography and audio recordings. The current version of Soundslides 3 was released August 2019. It is sold over the Internet through the Soundslides website. Soundslides projects are posted to the internet and are viewable through a web browser or on mobile devices including the iPhone, iPad, Android.

== History and development ==
Soundslides sprang from efforts by interactive producer Joe Weiss and instructors at the Western Kentucky University Mountain Workshop to create a software program that had a short learning curve and could make quick audio slideshows.

At the end of weeklong workshops, students and faculty members had eight hours to create audio slideshows for 50 multimedia stories. Weiss developed the software for the workshop and decided to make it available publicly in 2005.

== Availability ==
The current version of Soundslides Plus 1.9.5 is sold online by Soundslides for $69.95. A limited basic version is $39.95. A free trial version is available for 30 days. A new version will be released in the first half of 2013.

== Features ==
Soundslides operates in a single window on a Windows or Mac OS X computer.

Soundslides Plus includes:

- Audio slideshow production
- IPTC caption importing
- Template control
- Non-audio slideshows
- Full-screen playback
- Image movement (pan and zoom)
- Lower third subtitle

Soundslides Basic includes:

- Audio slideshow production
- IPTC caption importing
- Template control

== Reception and opinion ==
Critics of Soundslides have asked for more features. Many of the requested features are being incorporated into the new 2013 version. Issues include: Audio files and images must be managed and uploaded in separate files; Audio files must be MP3 or AIF only; Images must be JPGs.
